A Case of Two Cities is Qiu Xiaolong's fourth Inspector Chen novel (after 2004's When Red Is Black). Character, poetry, insights into Chinese society and culture, and food all come before story in this crime novel.

Plot summary
Inspector Chen Cao of the Shanghai Police Department is assigned a high-profile anti-corruption case, one in which the principal figure has long since fled to the United States and beyond the reach of the Chinese government. But he left behind the organization and his partners-in-crime, and Inspector Chen is charged to uncover those responsible and act as necessary to end the corruption ring though he is not sure whether he's actually being set up to fail. The investigation takes him from Shanghai all the way to the U.S. where he meets his colleague and counterpart from the U.S. Marshall's Service, Inspector Catherine Rhon.

Literary Review
There's something especially brave and noble about a cop who perseveres under difficult circumstances. Readers who love China will be heartened, as this gritty, suspenseful tale unfolds, to discover that Inspector Chen is far from alone in his quest to build a humane Chinese society.

Hidden under the surface of the crime novel are some observations by the author. Qiu comments through his tale about the changing scape of China's economy and how new crime and corruption are rising with the general prosperity of China.  
He also shows many cultural differences that are created or perhaps only now noticed as China changes her economic status and how these simple differences can create hostility.  The author also illustrated how cultural differences may lead to hostility or bad feelings, for example, when the Chinese delegation find no water bottles for tea in their hotel rooms when visiting the US for the first time, as opposed to China, where there would be water bottles in each hotel room for tea. Therefore, the absence of hot water bottles is an oversight and is equal to an insult. From the American perceptive, a hot water bottle is not a standard requirement item in the hotel room, as offering tea to your guests is not a standard for the Americans.

References

2006 American novels
Novels by Qiu Xiaolong
Novels set in China
Novels set in the United States
Minotaur Books books